Jakub Strnad (born February 16, 1992) is a Czech professional ice hockey player. He played with HC Kladno in the Czech Extraliga during the 2010–11 Czech Extraliga playoffs.

References

External links

1992 births
Czech ice hockey forwards
Rytíři Kladno players
Living people
Sportspeople from Kladno
HC Berounští Medvědi players
Oshawa Generals players
IHC Písek players
Motor České Budějovice players
HC Sparta Praha players
BK Mladá Boleslav players
Czech expatriate ice hockey players in Canada